Jenny Valentine (born 1970) is an English children's novelist. For her first novel and best-known work, Finding Violet Park (HarperCollins, 2007), she won the annual Guardian Children's Fiction Prize, a once-in-a-lifetime book award judged by a panel of British children's writers. 
Valentine lives in Glasbury-on-Wye, Wales with her husband singer/songwriter Alex Valentine, with whom she runs a health food shop in nearby Hay-on-Wye.

Writer
HarperCollins has published Valentine's novels in Britain and usually one year later in America. Finding Violet Park (2007) was re-titled Me, The Missing and The Dead in the US (2008). Beside winning the Guardian Prize it made the shortlist (seven finalists that year) for the annual Carnegie Medal, which the British librarians confer upon the year's best children's book published in the UK Basque, Catalan and Italian translations of the book were published in 2008, followed by versions in Dutch, French, German, Slovenian, Spanish, and Norwegian.

Her critically acclaimed second novel, Broken Soup, published in January 2008, was shortlisted for the 2008 Waterstone's Children's Book Prize and the 2008 Costa Book Children's Book Award, and longlisted for the 2008 Booktrust Teenage Prize. By 2010 it had also been published in Dutch and German-language translations.

"Ten Stations", a short-story prequel to Finding Violet Park, was included among 2009 World Book Day publications. That year Valentine also inaugurated a series of short stories for young children entitled Iggy and Me. 

Valentine's third novel, The Ant Colony, was published in 2009. By 2011 it had been published in Dutch and in German translations.

Her fourth novel, The Double Life of Cassiel Roadnight, was set in her home town of Hay-on-Wye. It was also her fourth novel nominated for the Carnegie Medal, i. e. it was one of the year's top forty children's books published in the UK, in the estimation of librarians. By 2011 it had also been published in Dutch.

Valentine takes part annually in the Hay Festival.

Works

Doppelganger (HarperCollins, 2010)
Iggy & me
Iggy & me: The happy birthday (#2, HarperCollins, 2010) 
Iggy & me on holiday (#3, HarperCollins, 2010)
Iggy & me and the baby (#4, HarperCollins, 2011)

References

External links

"The Story of My Children's Book Prize" by Valentine, theguardian.com, 9 October 2007

21st-century British novelists
British children's writers
British writers of young adult literature
Guardian Children's Fiction Prize winners
Living people
Place of birth missing (living people)
1970 births